Murphy Ijemba is a Nigerian radio personality who anchors RUSH HOUR show on 97.7 METRO FM. His radio anchoring style has since won him several nominations and accolades at award ceremonies in Nigeria.

Early life and education
He is Igbo. He was born in Mushin, a suburb of Lagos State, where he went on to complete his primary and secondary school education. He holds a B.Sc certificate in Accounting after graduating from Bayero University, Kano. In an interview with Emmanuel Tobi of The New Telegraph, he revealed that he had to sell chickens in order to financially support his education.

Career
He started his radio career as a presenter at Raypower FM in Kano under Daar Communications where he worked for 5 years. He joined Brila FM in 2011 where he developed in his craft before he controversially quit the radio station in 2017 upon tendering his resignation letter citing the need to improve his "capacity academically and professionally". He is a brand ambassador for 360Bet and Zutasia.

Awards and nominations

References

Living people
People from Lagos State by occupation
Bayero University Kano alumni
Nigerian radio presenters
Brila FM presenters
Year of birth missing (living people)